Stanley Churchill Ramsey (1882 – 25 December 1968) was a British architect, who worked in partnership with Stanley Davenport Adshead from 1911 to 1931. In 1911, Adshead was invited to design the Duchy of Cornwall Estate in Kennington, and took Ramsey into partnership.

Notable buildings
St Anselm's Church, Kennington (1932–33) with Adshead

References

1882 births
1968 deaths
Architects from London